Liolaemus gravenhorstii, commonly known as Gravenhorst's tree iguana, is a species of lizard in the family Iguanidae. The species is endemic to South America.

Etymology
The specific name, gravenhorstii, is in honor of German herpetologist Johann Ludwig Christian Gravenhorst.

Geographic range
L. gravenhorstii is found in western Argentina (in the provinces of Mendoza and San Juan) and in central Chile.

References

Further reading
Boulenger GA (1885). Catalogue of the Lizards in the British Museum (Natural History). Second Edition. Volume II. Iguanidæ ... London: Trustees of the British Museum (Natural History). (Taylor and Francis, printers). xiii + 497 pp. + Plates I-XXIV. (Liolæmus gravenhorstii, new combination, pp. 142-143 + Plate X, figures 1, 1a).
Gray JE (1845). Catalogue of the Specimens of Lizards in the Collection of the British Museum. London: Trustees of the British Museum. (Edward Newman, printer). xxviii + 289 pp. (Leiodera gravenhorstii, new species, p. 211).

External links
ZipcodeZoo: Liolaemus gravenhorstii
How to keep lizards

gravenhorstii
Lizards of South America
Endemic fauna of Chile
Reptiles of Chile
Reptiles described in 1845
Taxa named by John Edward Gray
Taxonomy articles created by Polbot